oeFun, inc. is an independent video game studio based in Austin, Texas. Created in 2005 by Ian Dunlop, the company's mission is to develop fun and innovative video games. While the company intends to create games for a variety of platforms, they are currently an official Nintendo developer, focused on titles for the Nintendo DS and Wii. oeFun consists of a small team of developers, most of which are new to game development. Dunlop, however, has over 18 years of experience in the industry.

The letters "oe" in the name don't have an official meaning, but they do have several meanings. According to oeFun's founder, the letters will have meaning and context in future projects.

Games developed by oeFun
Konductra (Nintendo DS, 2006)

Games in development
T.D.I.T... (a.k.a. The Day I Tried...) (iPhone, iPad, release date pending)
Konductra: Graveyard Shift (iPhone, iPad, release date pending)

References

External links
oeFun
Sliced Gaming Interview

Video game companies of the United States
Companies established in 2005